The 1967–68 season was the 66th in the history of the Western Football League.

The champions for the first time in their history were Bridgwater Town.

Final table
The league remained at 21 clubs after Exeter City Reserves and Weymouth Reserves left. Two new clubs joined:

Bath City Reserves, rejoining the league after leaving in 1965.
Devizes Town

References

1967-68
5